is an upcoming action role-playing game developed and published by Square Enix. It will be the fifteenth installment in the Kingdom Hearts series, beginning the "Lost Master" story arc. Set after the events of Kingdom Hearts III and Kingdom Hearts: Melody of Memory, returning protagonist Sora has become trapped in the life-like world of Quadratum, while his companions Donald Duck and Goofy try to find and rescue him.

Development on the next mainline entry after Kingdom Hearts III had begun by January 2020, with Kingdom Hearts IV formally announced in April 2022.

Gameplay 
Sora faces Heartless in the game. Parkour elements and Keyblade transformations return, with the Keyblade also able to transform into a grappling hook to traverse large distances. The game will also bring back the reaction commands from Kingdom Hearts II, and introduces a new "scrap and build" mechanic. More of Sora's "daily life" and his "day-to-day routines" are also explored.

Story

Setting 
Kingdom Hearts IV serves as the beginning of the "Lost Master" story arc. The game takes place in Quadratum, an expansive city set in a realistic world inspired by Tokyo, featuring a fictionalized Shibuya and Minami-Aoyama. Sora's apartment in Minami-Aoyama serves as the player's home base in the early part of the game. Quadratum serves as a hub world, with players returning there after traveling to other worlds. Several worlds based on Disney properties will also appear. The advancement of hardware capabilities since the series began played a factor in determining the number of worlds created for the game.

Characters 
Sora, a teenager who uses a key-shaped weapon called the Keyblade to battle the forces of darkness, reprises his role from previous games as the main protagonist and playable character of the game. Donald Duck and Goofy, the royal magician and knight captain of Disney Castle, also return after having served as Sora's party companions. The game also features Strelitzia, a Keyblade wielder who previously appeared in the mobile game Kingdom Hearts Union χ. Other main characters of the series, such as the protagonists of the games Kingdom Hearts Birth by Sleep and Kingdom Hearts 358/2 Days, are not expected to have much focus in Kingdom Hearts IV, with Nomura also open to finding a "good balance" with regards to including Final Fantasy characters that have been a part of the series.

Development 

Though Kingdom Hearts III was the end of the "Dark Seeker Saga" which revolved around Xehanort, it had been decided where certain characters end up in order to potentially continue their stories in future games. The ending of Kingdom Hearts III and its downloadable content (DLC) Re Mind saw Sora end up in the city of Quadratum and the appearance of the character Yozora, who was the main character of the in-universe video game Verum Rex. Quadratum had designs elements that evoked Shibuya from Square Enix's franchise The World Ends with You as well as Final Fantasy Versus XIII, which eventually was reworked to become Final Fantasy XV, while Yozora's design was similar to Noctis Lucis Caelum, the main protagonist of Final Fantasy XV, and part of his appearance mimicked an early trailer for Versus XIII. Commentators believed series director Tetsuya Nomura, who was also the director of Versus XIII before it was reworked, was planning to implement some of his ideas from that game in a future Kingdom Hearts title. In March 2020, Nomura said Versus XIII and Verum Rex were "completely different" but an "unexpected development" between the two was occurring, and later confirmed the Shibuya in Quadratum was unrelated to that in The World Ends with You.

In January 2020, Nomura said there would need to be "more time" before the next main entry in the series. Additionally, he revealed that there were two new development teams, separate from those that worked on the Re Mind DLC and the Union χ/Dark Road team, working on Kingdom Hearts content. In September 2020, Nomura stated that the development team was in the process of discussing the series' future plans between Square Enix and Disney, and that "nothing has been set in stone, but I do have some concepts percolating in my head". He added that Yozora would "definitely... be involved" in the future of the series, in an unexpected and surprising way.

In April 2022, Square Enix revealed Kingdom Hearts IV was in development during the series' 20th anniversary celebration. The game is being developed by Square Enix Business Division 3, the same Osaka-based team that developed Kingdom Hearts III, with Tai Yasue serving as co-director, and Masaru Oka and Akiko Ishibashi joining Nomura to write the game. The game's reveal trailer was created with Unreal Engine 4, with the final game planned to be made with Unreal Engine 5. Wesley Leblanc of Game Informer felt Nomura was able to realize his vision for Versus XIII with the game and the "Verum Rex side of the franchise", and called the inclusion of Donald and Goofy at the end of the trailer a way to reassure players that the Disney elements of the franchise would continue. Nomura had also originally planned to create the Verum Rex game in its entirety, but noted the difficulty of creating two console games simultaneously. Kingdom Hearts IVs theme was described by Nomura as the contrast between the inhabitants of Sora's original world believing the inhabitants of Quadratum are fictional and vice versa.

In June 2022, Nomura revealed that the mobile game Kingdom Hearts Missing-Link would be connected to Kingdom Hearts IV explaining that there were "some figures that appear" in Missing-Link that were tied to the story of IV.

Design 
Sora receives an updated look for the game, having a more realistic art style. Quadratum and the non-playable characters also have a realistic design. The design team was challenged to make the world as realistic as possible; previously in the series, the most "realistic" world was the one based on the Pirates of the Caribbean films. Conversely, characters in the original world of the series, such as Donald and Goofy, continue to use the shaders and designs introduced in Kingdom Hearts III, with Nomura stating if Sora were to return to his world, his look would revert.

Notes

References

External links 
 Japanese website
 

Action role-playing video games
Crossover role-playing video games
Disney video games
Donald Duck video games
Goofy (Disney) video games
Kingdom Hearts
Single-player video games
Square Enix games
Upcoming video games
Video game sequels
Video games developed in Japan
Video games directed by Tetsuya Nomura
Video games set in a fictional location